Eve Teschmacher is the name of multiple fictional characters appearing in DC Comics–related media. The character was portrayed by Valerie Perrine in the Christopher Reeve Superman films and by Andrea Brooks in the Arrowverse series Supergirl.

Film
Created by Richard Donner and Mario Puzo, Eve Teschmacher first appears in Superman and Superman II, portrayed by Valerie Perrine. Miss Teschmacher is Lex Luthor's assistant and shares a relationship with her employer similar to that of a gun moll. In the film series, Eve is Lex Luthor's closest assistant and apparently his love interest, although she is also attracted to her employer's arch-foe Superman. She frequently questions Luthor's evil schemes, and is clearly disloyal during his planned "Crime of The Century", rescuing Superman from certain death to thwart Luthor. However, this only happens after she makes Superman promise to save her mother in Hackensack, New Jersey, to which Lex has sent a nuclear missile.

In Superman II, she uses a hot-air balloon to rescue Lex from the State Penitentiary, along with his assistant Otis, whom Luthor leaves behind since he weighs down the balloon. According to the Superman II: Richard Donner Cut, she talks of going on a vacation with Lex to somewhere romantic, but Lex insists on going north to Superman's Fortress of Solitude to learn the secret of Superman's abilities. Miss Teschmacher reluctantly goes along with his plan. 

Eva is mentioned in the animated movie Superman: Red Son.

A character similar to Eve Teschmacher named Kitty Kowalski appears in Superman Returns, portrayed by Parker Posey.

Television

Smallville
A character loosely based on Eve Teschmacher appears in Smallville as Tess Mercer who is a composite of Eve, Mercy Graves, and Lena Luthor. The name Tess Mercer is a reference to Teschmacher.

Arrowverse
Eve Teschmacher appears in Supergirl portrayed by Andrea Brooks. She also makes a cameo in The Flash season three episode "Dead or Alive". Eve Teschmacher is the personal assistant of Jimmy Olsen and Lena Luthor, previously Cat Grant. After Kara Danvers was promoted, she recommended Eve to be her replacement as Cat's assistant. Cat found her inadequate, particularly compared to Kara, and often screamed at her. She was apparently reduced to tears on more than one occasion because of this. At one point, Eve forgot Cat's coffee, and as a punishment Cat made her call the dean of Yale and admonish him for having given her a diploma. Eve became James Olsen's assistant after Cat decided to take a leave of absence from CatCo. She was instantly infatuated with "Mike Matthews" (the fake identity of Mon-El) on his first day at work, and willingly helped him with his files. She and Mon-El are later caught having sexual relations in a copy room by Kara. Later on, she let Mon-El use her credit card to buy a suit to wear to go to Lena Luthor's charity event. Some days later, while working one night, she witnessed Vibe and Gypsy duel, questioning herself in the background about why National City got weirder every day, as the two jumped into another universe. After Kara rejected Mon-El, he decided to move on and went on a date with Eve, but it went badly for her as he could only talk about Kara the whole time. Eve told him that he had to get over his ex if he ever wanted to date anyone else, to which he quickly responded that he and Kara never dated.

A few days later, When Kara bumped into Eve, she asked how things were going with "Mike" as she thought they were dating and Eve told her the truth of what had happened. Kara told Eve that she and "Mike" never dated, and Eve slyly replied that this was what he also said. Eve later acts as the research assistant of Lena Luthor, helping with her experiments at L-Corp and the D.E.O. headquarters. As the series goes forwards, it is revealed that Eve's true alliance lies with Lex Luthor. Eve betrayed Lena by giving Lex a cure for his disease and it is revealed that Eve has been working for Lex Luthor all along as his spy and helper. In the season finale, it is revealed that Teschmacher is being controlled by a group called Leviathan who had her work with Lex. After Lex was defeated, an incognito Eve tries to leave National City only to be intercepted by their representative Margot who states that her job isn't done yet.

In season five, Eve returns to National City under Leviathan's orders and is blackbagged by Lena. Using a miniature device on Eve's head, Lena maps out Eve's brain. After Andrea Rojas cuts her off, Lena moves on to Plan B where she reveals that she mapped out the loyalty parts of Eve's brain where she uploads her A.I. Hope into it enabling Hope to control Eve's body. After the attempt to use a weapon satellite, Hope in Eve's body takes the blame and is arrested by the FBI. Sometime after the Crisis on Infinite Earths where Earth-Prime is formed, Eve is shown as an employee at Obsidian Tech. She is asked by Andrea to look into the bug patches in the Obsidian Lenses. In the episode "Deus Lex Machina," Eve was mentioned to have been coerced into working for Leviathan as their assassin after her father was killed. In a flashback, Lex found her on one of her assignments and persuaded her to work as her inside person while providing protection for her mother and planning to give the information of the person who killed her father. Some of the events she helped Lex with was the actions caused by Amy Sapphire and Richard Bates. Eve was then tricked into killing Jeremiah Danvers who Lex claimed was the one who killed her father. Following Supergirl stopping the Sun-Eater and Lex killing Margot to rescue those trapped in virtual reality, Lex revealed his lie about Jeremiah killing her father and has the footage of it as a way to keep her loyalty and to keep her from being at the other end of Supergirl's eye beams. When Eve states to Lex that he is worse than Leviathan, Lex replied that he is better. Lex threatens Eve’s mother if she tries to double cross him. After defeating Leviathan, Supergirl focuses her attention on Luthor. Supergirl rescues Eve’s mother from Lex’s assassins. Lex is arrested for his multiple crimes and put on trial. Eve testifies against him, telling the court about his plans for world domination. Acting as his own attorney, Lex discredits her testimony by citing their romantic history and claims her testimony is nothing more but slander from a scorned lover. The jury believes this argument and acquits Lex of all charges. Eve Teschmacher is not seen for the remainder of the series and her ultimate fate after double crossing Lex is unknown.

Comics
 Eve Teschmacher first appeared in JLA: Earth-2. She worked as Lex Luthor's secretary. At one point, she was unaware that her boss was replaced by a counterpart from another universe, who gives her some vacation time and $80,000 into her account.
 Eve appears in Superman Returns: Prequel Comic #3, a tie-in comic to the titular film.
 Eve Teschmacher is mentioned in Superman: Red Son #2 (Earth-30).
 Eve Teschmacher appears in Superman Family Adventures #5, 9 and 12.

References

External links
 
 
 
 

Film characters introduced in 1978
Superman characters
Superman (1978 film series) characters
Articles about multiple fictional characters
DC Comics female supervillains